HD 93905 (HR 4238) is a solitary star located in the southern constellation Antlia. The star has an absolute magnitude of 0 and an apparent magnitude of 5.61, making it faintly visible to the naked eye under ideal conditions.

This star has a classification of A1 V, which indicates that it is an ordinary A-type main-sequence star that is fusing hydrogen at its core. At present it has 2.78 times the mass of the Sun but is large and over luminous for its class with 3.89 times and 101 times the radius and luminosity of the Sun respectively. This is because HD 93905 has already completed most of its main sequence lifetime at an age of 256 million years.

References

A-type main-sequence stars
Antlia
Antliae, 80
Durchmusterung objects
093905
052965
4238